Dater may refer to:

Judy Dater, an American photographer
Philip D. Dater, associated with the War of 1812
Dater Glacier in Antarctica
Dater High School (Cincinnati, Ohio), a high school in Cincinnati, Ohio
A participant in dating